Vitali Charapenka (born 27 January 1984) is a Belarusian handball player for HC Meshkov Brest and the Belarusian national team.

References

1984 births
Living people
Belarusian male handball players
Sportspeople from Brest, Belarus